Federal elections were held in Czechoslovakia on 8 and 9 June 1990, alongside elections for the Czech and Slovak Assemblies.  They were the first elections held in the country since the Velvet Revolution seven months earlier. Voter turnout was 96.2%.

The movement led by President Václav Havel emerged as the largest bloc, with majorities in both houses of parliament–something that no Czechoslovak party or alliance had previously achieved in a free election. The Czech wing, Civic Forum (OF), won 68 of the 150 seats in the House of the People and 50 of the 150 seats in the House of Nations, whilst its Slovak counterpart, Public Against Violence (VPN), won 19 seats in the House of the People and 33 in the House of Nations. The Communist Party of Czechoslovakia, running in its first election since giving up power, made a stronger showing than expected, receiving 13 percent of the vote in both chambers, finishing second behind Civic Forum.

Although OF and VPN had more than enough seats between them to govern without the support of other parties, they sought a broader base. They let it be known that they were willing to go into coalition with any party except the Communists and the Slovak National Party.

Results

House of the People

House of Nations

References

Czechoslovakia
Legislative elections in Czechoslovakia
1990 elections in Czechoslovakia
1990s elections in Czechoslovakia
June 1990 events in Europe